Arida may refer to:

Arida (plant), a genus of plants in the family Asteraceae
Arida, Lebanon, a village in Lebanon
Arida, Wakayama, a city in Japan
Arida District, Wakayama, a district in Japan

People 

 Anthony Peter Arida (1863–1955), Maronite patriarch of Antioch
 Ariella Arida (born 1988), Filipino actress
 May Arida (1926–2018), Lebanese socialite
 Nasib Arida (1887–1946), Syrian-born American poet and writer
 Pérsio Arida (born 1952), Brazilian economist
 Zeina Arida (born 1970), Lebanese museum executive